GroupMe is a mobile group messaging app owned by Microsoft. It was launched in May 2010 by the private company GroupMe. In August 2011, GroupMe delivered over 100 million messages each month and by June 2012, that number jumped to 550 million. In 2013, GroupMe had over 12 million registered users.

History 

Grouply, the app that would become GroupMe, was created in May 2010, at a hackathon at the TechCrunch Disrupt conference. Its creators, Jared Hecht and Steve Martocci, intended the app to replace email chains as a method of communication. After investors took notice of the app, Hecht and Martocci took a loan from Hecht's parents and began working on their app full time. The name was changed to GroupMe in August. The same month, GroupMe raised $85,000 from investors. The app was released on the App Store in October 2010.

In January 2011, GroupMe received US$10.6 million in venture capital from Khosla Ventures, General Catalyst Partners, angel investors, and others. In August 2011, Skype acquired the one-year-old start-up for around $80 million. Skype had itself been purchased by Microsoft in May 2011, with the purchase finalized in October 2011. The app underwent a redesign in late 2012.

Initially, groups were limited to 100 members, but a support request could get a group's limit raised as high as necessary as it approached the limit. In 2019, GroupMe stopped offering group member limit increases; however, the app increased the standard limit from 100 to 5000.

Usage 

GroupMe works by downloading the app or accessing the service online, and then forming an account by providing your name, cell phone number and a password, or connecting through a Facebook or Twitter account. The service then syncs with your contacts and from that point forward the user can make groups, limited to 5000 members. An individual who is part of an active group has the ability to turn off notifications for the app; users will still receive the message, but will not be notified about it. Each group is given a label and assigned a unique number. Some of the features of the app include the ability to share photos, videos, locations, create events, and emojis from various packs.

GroupMe has a web client as well as apps for iOS, Android, Windows Phone, and Windows 10.
Those who do not wish to use the app can still send and receive GroupMe messages through SMS (only available in the United States).
Users begin by creating a “group” and adding contacts. When someone sends a message, everyone in the group can see and respond to it. The app allows users to easily attach and send pictures, documents, videos and web-links as well. Users can also send private messages, but only to users who are also active on the GroupMe app.

GroupMe has been used as a means for studying the usage of messaging clients in educational settings. Use cases include facilitating online course discussions, small group work, and other course communications for both in-person and online sections. Students who use GroupMe and other social platforms to facilitate discussion in an environment where they already interact has been found to encourage rhetorical thinking and overall engagement. Researchers have found alternatives for literacy learning as a "legitimate academic genre", given a student population that communicates in variety of modes. Research around GroupMe furthers the argument that computer-mediated communication is a valuable space for learning in an increasingly globalized society.

See also 

 Comparison of cross-platform instant messaging clients
Comparison of instant messaging protocols
Comparison of Internet Relay Chat clients
Comparison of LAN messengers
Comparison of VoIP software
List of SIP software
List of video telecommunication services and product brands

References

External links 
 groupme.com

Instant messaging clients
American companies established in 2010
Microsoft divisions
Android (operating system) software
Skype
2011 mergers and acquisitions